The 2023 Cazoo Premier League Darts is a darts tournament, organised by the Professional Darts Corporation – the nineteenth edition of the tournament. The event began on Thursday 2 February 2023, at the SSE Arena in Belfast, and will finish with the play-offs, at The O2 Arena in London on Thursday 25 May 2023. 

Michael van Gerwen is the defending champion after beating Joe Cullen 11–10 in the 2022 final.

Format
As introduced in 2022's tournament, the 2023 Premier League Darts uses an eight-person knockout bracket every night. Each of the seven matches will be played over the best-of-11 legs. The players will be guaranteed to meet each other once in the quarter-finals throughout the first seven weeks and once in the quarterfinals in weeks 9–15, with weeks 8 and 16 being drawn based on the league standings at that point. Players will receive two points per semi-final finish, three points per runner-up finish, and five points per final win.

Following the regular phase, the top four players in the league table will contest the two knockout semi-finals with 1st playing 4th and 2nd playing 3rd.

Venues
The 2023 tournament will keep the same 17 venues used in the 2022 Premier League. On 8 October 2022, it was announced that Liverpool and Brighton were switching dates, after Liverpool had been awarded the hosting duties for the Eurovision Song Contest.

Prize money
The prize money for the 2023 tournament is expected to remain at £1 million, including a £10,000 bonus to each night's winner.

Players
The format introduced in 2022 continued, which would encompass eight players, each playing against each other in a knockout tournament each night. The winner of each night would receive an additional £10,000 towards their prize money. Those who make it out of the last 8 each receive 2 points, the runner-up will receive 3 points and the winner receives 5.

The top 4 players on the PDC Order of Merit automatically qualified, with the remaining four announced following the conclusion of the Masters on 29 January 2023.

League stage
The fixtures were announced on 30 January 2023.

2 February – Night 1
 SSE Arena, Belfast

9 February – Night 2
 Cardiff International Arena, Cardiff

16 February – Night 3
 OVO Hydro, Glasgow

23 February – Night 4
 3Arena, Dublin

2 March – Night 5
 Westpoint Arena, Exeter

9 March – Night 6
 M&S Bank Arena, Liverpool

16 March – Night 7
 Motorpoint Arena Nottingham, Nottingham

Dobeys 6-0 win over Michael van Gerwen, was the first time in premier league history, that van gerwen had failed to score a single leg.

23 March – Night 8
 Utilita Arena Newcastle, Newcastle

Mercedes-Benz Arena, Berlin

6 April – Night 10
 Utilita Arena Birmingham, Birmingham

13 April – Night 11
 Brighton Centre, Brighton

20 April – Night 12
 Rotterdam Ahoy, Rotterdam

27 April – Night 13
 First Direct Arena, Leeds

4 May – Night 14
 AO Arena, Manchester

11 May – Night 15
 Utilita Arena Sheffield, Sheffield

18 May – Night 16
 P&J Live, Aberdeen

25 May – Play-offs
The top four players of the league stage contest in the play-offs to decide the champion of the Premier League.

 The O2, London

Standings

Five points are awarded for a night win, three points for the runner-up and two points for the semi-finalists. When players are tied on points, leg difference is used first as a tie-breaker, after that legs won against throw and then tournament average.

The top 4 players after 16 nights advance to the play-offs on 25 May.

 (Week 7)

(C) Champion after the playoffs, (RU) Runner-up after the playoffs

Streaks

Positions by Week

References

External links
 Professional Darts Corporation, official website
 PDC Professional Darts Corporation, official website, Tournaments

2023
2023 in British sport
2023 in darts
2023 in Irish sport
2023 in Dutch sport
2023 in German sport
Current darts seasons